Edgar Mandel (born 19 August 1928) is a German stage, film, and television actor who also appeared in audio plays.

Born in Speyer, he took part in the 1957 world premiere of Bertold Brecht's Die Gesichte der Simone Machard at the Theater Frankfurt, staged by Harry Buckwitz. He was a member of the Theater Dortmund.

Filmography 
Films with Mandel have included:
  (1970, TV miniseries)
  (1979)

References

External links 
 
 

1928 births
Living people
German male film actors
20th-century German male actors